The Dodge Colt is a subcompact car that was manufactured by Mitsubishi Motors and marketed by Dodge for model years 1971 to 1994 as captive imports. Rebadged variants include the Plymouth Champ and Plymouth Colt, both were marketed by Plymouth.

The Colt was initially a rebadged variant of the rear-wheel drive Galant and Lancer families before shifting to the smaller front-wheel drive Mitsubishi Mirage subcompacts in 1979.

First generation (1971-1973)

Introduced in 1970 as model year 1971, the first generation Dodge Colt was a federalized first-generation Mitsubishi Colt Galant. Available as a 2-door pillared coupe, 2-door hardtop coupe, 4-door sedan, and 5-door wagon, the Colt had a  4-cylinder engine. The unibody layout was traditional, front engine and rear-wheel drive with MacPherson struts in front and a live rear axle. Standard transmission was a 4-speed manual, with a 3-speed automatic being an option. For 1973, a GT hardtop coupe model was added featuring rally stripes, sport wheels, and a center console amongst other features. The Dodge Colt was Chrysler's response to the AMC Gremlin, Ford Pinto, and Chevrolet Vega. As a captive import from Mitsubishi, the Colt also competed directly with other Japanese imports, such as the Toyota Corolla, Honda Civic and Datsun 1200.

Second generation (1974-1977)

Based on the platform of the first generation model, the Galant sedans and coupes received a new, somewhat rounder body in 1973, while wagons continued with the old body with a facelifted front end. The new version, with single headlights rather than the doubles of the previous generation, became the 1974 Dodge Colt in the US, available in the same bodystyles as the first one. The base engine also remained the same, but a larger G52B "Astron" engine became optionally available, originally only in combination with the automatic transmission. Later, the 2-liter engine became available with a manual transmission as well and was made standard fitment in the GT coupe. The 2-liter engine develops  at 5500 rpm, with the California version making two fewer horsepower.

A four-speed manual or three-speed automatic remained available, although the original Borg-Warner automatic transmission was replaced by Chrysler's own Torqueflite unit in the 2-liter version. The Torqueflite later supplanted the old Borg-Warner unit entirely. For 1977 a five-speed manual became available (standard in the GT and Carousel coupes). The Carousel, introduced in 1975 along with larger bumpers, was more luxurious and carried a blue and white paint job. For 1977, the "Silent Shaft" version of the smaller engine became available and was fitted as standard equipment in GT and Carousels. The introduction of the new Dodge Colt "Mileage Maker" meant there was a mix of second and third generation models in 1977. The second-generation 2-door hardtops and wagons continued to be offered alongside the new 2- and 4-door "Mileage Makers". The wagon was also available with an "Estate" package that included woodgrain applique on the body sides and adjustable reclining front seats.

This model was also sold as the Dodge Colt 1600 GS in South Africa, only as a two-door hardtop coupé.

In Canada, the second-generation Dodge Colt was also available as the Plymouth Cricket for the 1974 and 1975 model years. All 1974 and 1975 Crickets wore the grille that came standard on 1974 - 1977 Dodge Colt station wagons. All Colt body styles were shared with the Cricket, with the Cricket equivalent of the Colt GT being called Cricket Formula S. These second-generation, Canada-only Crickets were rebadged as Plymouth Colts for 1976.

Third generation (1977-1979)

The third-generation Dodge Colt was effectively made up of two lines: coupes and sedans were of a smaller, Lancer-based series, while the station wagons were based on the new Mitsubishi Galant Sigma. In late 1976, for the 1977 model year, the smaller A70-series Mitsubishi Lancer became the Dodge Colt available in two-door coupe and four-door sedan body designs. While the wheelbase was slightly shorter than that of the second generation Colt, overall length was down from 171.1 to 162.6 inches (4346 to 4130 mm). The new Colt was also referred to as the Dodge Colt "Mileage Maker" to differentiate it from its larger predecessor. Second generation coupe and wagon versions remained on sale for the 1977 model year.

A "Silent Shaft" (balance shaft) version of this engine along with a five-speed manual transmission (instead of the standard four-speed) were part of a "Freeway Cruise" package, which also included a maroon/white paintjob.

For 1978 a new Dodge Colt wagon was the larger, rebadged Mitsubishi Galant Sigma. The 1.6-litre MCA-Jet four as the smaller sedans and coupes was standard with the 2.6-litre,  Astron engine optional as well as a five-speed manual transmission. While the last year for the Lancer-based Colts was 1979, the wagon was continued alongside the front-wheel drive Mirage-based fourth generation models until 1981 when it was effectively replaced by the domestic Dodge Aries K wagon. The larger Mitsubishi Galant Lambda coupé was also marketed as the Dodge Colt Challenger from 1978, although the "Colt" part was later dropped. It shared the chassis as well as the engine options of the Colt wagon.

Fourth generation (1979-1984)

From late-1978 for model year 1979, the Dodge Colt and Plymouth Champ nameplates were applied to the front-wheel-drive Mitsubishi Mirage imports into North America. The Colt and Champ (Plymouth Colt after 1982) as a 3-door hatchback, and came in Deluxe or Custom equipment levels. These imports used a  Mitsubishi Orion 4G12 1.4-liter overhead-cam, four-cylinder engine at first, which received the highest United States Environmental Protection Agency fuel economy rating in its debut year. This engine was joined by the 1.6-liter,  4G32 Saturn engine at the end of the year. For 1981, a bare bones "low-line" version was introduced. An RS package also became available, with stiffer suspension, sportier interior with extra gauges, and a larger fuel tank.

There were three manual transmissions and one automatic transmission available. There was a KM110 four-speed manual transmission or a "Twin Stick" (Mitsubishi Super Shift) version of the transmission that used a two-speed transfer case to give 8 forward and 2 reverse speeds. There was also the option of a KM119 five-speed manual transmission or a TorqueFlite three-speed automatic transmission.

For 1982 a five-door hatchback joined the lineup. The names of the equipment levels changed to "E" and "DL". At some point claimed power dropped to 64 and 72 hp respectively for the small and large engines, while the 1.6 was only available with the automatic transmission. In August 1983, for the 1984 model year (which was to be the last year of this model of Colt), the GTS Turbo model arrived along with a naturally aspirated GTS package, similar to the earlier RS one. Unique for North America - the turbocharged Colt/Mirages sold elsewhere had a 1.4-litre engine - this used the fuel-injected 1.6-litre 4G32T engine also seen in the next-generation Colt, providing  at 5500 rpm and considerable performance. It, too, featured the eight speed Twin Stick transmission and also received ventilated brakes in front. Both GTS models, available with three-door bodywork only, received a larger  gas tank rather than the E and DL's  tank. They also featured a sporty appearance with uprated suspension, blacked out trim details, and a sizable front air dam.

Fifth generation (1985)

In September 1984, the fifth generation Dodge/Plymouth Colt appeared (model year 1985). There was also a five-door minivan/station wagon called the Dodge/Plymouth "Colt Vista"; this was simply a rebadged Mitsubishi Chariot. A twin-barrel carbureted  1468 cc four was the Colt's base engine, while the 4G32BT turbocharged 1.6-litre already seen in the last model year of the previous Colts was optional on the upscale Premier four-door sedan and standard on the GTS Turbo hatchback. Power remained  at 5500 rpm, as for the previous generation. A first for FWD Colts was the availability of a three-box four-door sedan body; it and the 3-door hatchback were available in the US from 1985–88; the 5-door hatchback only in 1985 (and only in base E trim) and the wagon not until 1988. The five-door hatchback was only available for a single model year as Chrysler was worried about this car cannibalizing sales of their own Omni/Horizon. The five-door was replaced by the E sedan for 1986. In Canada, the five-door hatchback was also available in DL trim.

Beginning in early 1988, Chrysler Canada began sourcing Colts from Thailand, assembled there from Japanese parts, planning on bringing in 8,000 cars per annum. From 1988 (and lasting until 1991), the Colt/Mirage was also marketed as the Eagle Vista in Canada.

Early cars have small rectangular headlights in black inserts, while later models received more aerodynamic, flush-fitting units. The facelift model appeared for the 1987 model year, presented in late September 1986. The lowest-priced model was the "E" (for economy), followed by the "DL" and topped by the turbocharged but slow selling Premier and GTS Turbo models. In 1987 the turbocharged engine became an option for the DL hatchback, which replaced the GTS. The DL Turbo remained available through 1988. 1988 also marked the introduction of the wagon, initially only available with front-wheel drive. Unlike the remainder of the lineup, the 1988 wagon received a fuel injected version of the 1.5-liter engine which produces  at 5500 rpm.

The Colt wagon, while never available with the turbocharged engine, did receive a more powerful 1,755 cc engine in the four-wheel-drive version which was added for 1989. The Wagon was only ever offered in DL trim. Unlike the FWD version, the DL 4x4 was not available with an automatic transmission. The larger engine produces . For the fifth generation Colt's final year in the United States, the DL model received fully body-colored trim (including bumpers, mirrors, and so on) for what Plymouth referred to as a "dipped look."

While the hatchback Colts were replaced for 1989 in the United States, the Colt Wagon continued to be available until the 1991 introduction of the Mitsubishi RVR-based Colt Wagon, which also replaced the Colt Vista. The late Colt Wagons of this generation received the newer, twin cam Sirius 1.6-liter engine with  when equipped with front-wheel drive. This model was also marketed as the Eagle Vista Wagon in Canada. In Canada, this generation Colt sedans and hatchbacks also continued to be offered alongside the next generation under the Colt 100 moniker, as a lower-priced alternative to the new model which was badged "Colt 200". The Colt 100 was still available with the turbo engine as well as in luxuriously appointed LX trim in 1990, but by 1991 only the E and DL models remained.

Sixth generation (1989-1992)

For the 1989 model year, Eagle began marketing its Summit as another rebadged Mitsubishi Mirage. Sales started in August 1988. In Canada, the previous generation continued as a carryover model with Eagle Vista or Colt 100 badging, replacing the earlier Colt sedan. The new model was sold as the Dodge/Plymouth Colt 200 in Canada, to distinguish it from the previous version.

Since the demise of the Dodge Omni/Plymouth Horizon in 1990, the Colt was the only subcompact in the Dodge and Plymouth lineups. The Colt sedan was not sold in the United States for the sixth generation (though it was sold in Canada), as it would be replaced by the Dodge Shadow/Plymouth Sundance liftbacks in the Dodge/Plymouth lineup for 1989. The sedan bodywork, however, was available to American consumers as an Eagle Summit. Dodge and Plymouth Colt sedans returned for 1993-1994 as a variant of the next-generation Eagle Summit. The Dodge/Plymouth Colt, Eagle Summit, and Mitsubishi Mirage of this generation used 1.5 or 1.6-litre inline-four engines.

A model powered by the 1.6-litre 4G61T  turbocharged four-cylinder was produced for the 1989 model year only. There are a rumored 1,500 of these special editions to have been produced. The engine was only offered in the Mirage and the Colt GT Turbo, which were distinguished by their ground effects and spoilers (although these parts were also available for a price as add-ons to other model ranges) and by their extra features not normally found on base model ranges such as power seats, power windows, power locks, and power mirrors, special colored interior and seats, as well as a 150 mph/9000 rpm gauge cluster. The Turbo Colt/Mirage Turbo was one of Car and Driver magazine's Ten Best for 1989. A naturally aspirated version of this engine was available for the following years Colt GT, with power down to 113 hp.

Power of the 1.5-litre 4G15 was up to  thanks to multi-point fuel injection.

The Colt Wagon was redesigned in 1991, now based on the RVR, and continued in production until the 1996 model year.

Seventh generation (1993-1994)

The seventh generation of the Colt was the same as Plymouth's version, and also the same as the Eagle Summit. As usual, they were all simply badge-engineered versions of the Mitsubishi Mirage/Lancer. There was no hatchback version of the seventh generation Dodge/Plymouth Colt. Originally available in Base and GL versions, the ES (with supposedly more sporting intentions) was added later.

1.5 and 1.8 litre four-cylinder engines were used, with the larger engine originally only available to four-door Colts. While the sporting variants offered in the sixth generation were not renewed, the two-door ES was available with the more powerful sixteen-valve SOHC 1.8 for the 1994 model year. The smaller engine has  while the larger version has . The previous Colt Wagon (Mitsubishi RVR) continued to be sold until 1996, while the Dodge and Plymouth Colts were replaced by the new Neon after the 1994 model year.

Related versions
The Plymouth Cricket nameplate was used (in addition to Dodge Colt) on Galants sold in Canada between mid-1973 and 1975, after Chrysler stopped using the Plymouth Cricket name for a rebadged Hillman Avenger-based model sourced from the United Kingdom (and sold across North America between 1971 and 1973).

The Plymouth Arrow was offered from 1976 to 1980 as a rebadged version of the Mitsubishi Lancer Celeste, not to be confused with the rebadged Mitsubishi truck sold as the Plymouth Arrow starting in 1979.

References

External links

Colt/Champ/Cricket infos on Allpar
Colt/Summit/Mirage US based forum

Colt
Compact cars
Front-wheel-drive vehicles
Rear-wheel-drive vehicles
Coupés
Hatchbacks
Sedans
Station wagons
Cars introduced in 1970
1980s cars
1990s cars
Cars discontinued in 1994